Milda Jankauskaitė (born 1 October 1995) is a Lithuanian racing cyclist. She rode at the 2014 UCI Road World Championships.

References

External links
 

1995 births
Living people
Lithuanian female cyclists
Place of birth missing (living people)